Cyperus elatus is a species of Cyperus in the sedge family, Cyperaceae, which is found from China to tropical Asia, and to Indonesia.

The species was first described by Carl Linnaeus in 1756.

References

External links
Cyperus elatus occurrence data from GBIF

elatus